Birchgrove ferry wharf (also known as Yurulbin Point ferry wharf and, formerly, Longnose Point ferry wharf) is located on Sydney Harbour serving the Sydney suburb of Birchgrove. The single wharf is served by First Fleet, SuperCat and Emerald class ferries.

Birchgrove is also served by Captain Cook Cruises Lane Cove River services. Located near the wharf is a board which tells the Aboriginal history of the area.

The wharf was closed for a major upgrade on 17 October 2017, reopening on 24 April 2018.

Wharves & services

References

External links

 Birchgrove Wharf at Transport for New South Wales (Archived 10 June 2019)
Birchgrove Local Area Map Transport for NSW

Ferry wharves in Sydney
Birchgrove, New South Wales